Gokulathil Seethai is a 2019 Indian Tamil language soap opera broadcasting on Zee Tamil. It starring Asha Gowda and Nanda Gopal in the lead roles. The show premiered on 4 November 2019 and ended on 14 May 2022.

Plot
Vasundhara "Vasu" from a middle-class family, worked in bouquet shop. She has mother Thulasi, stepfather Hari , younger half- sister Elakkiya and grandmother Gandhimati – a greedy and arrogant lady, who was Vasu's father's sister. She always hates Vasu and her mother because of an accident that happened in past. Meanwhile, Suchitra – a rich and handicapped lady, whose first son Arjun is a playboy and irresponsible man who always is free and who does not listen to his mother, whatever she says. Arjun always does anything his aunt Pappima says. Suchitra worries about Arjun for his attitude and carelessness because of the accident happened in past. (Both accidents are related and coincide with each other)

In past, Suchitra, her husband Jaikrishna Rajashekar "JKR", (played by Jeeva Ravi) with their son young Arjun, who was about ten years had gone in a car to attend the function. That time Suchitra was pregnant. As JKR drove the car, Arjun wished to drove. Suchitra not allowed Arjun but JKR convinced her and allowed Arjun to sit in front him at driver seat to drive. On that gap, Arjun drinks a coke and that tin was stuck on the brake pedal. After some minutes JKR unable to stop the car. Suchitra got shocked and told JKR to stop the car, but he can't put a break. As car the moved fast, suddenly they hit an old man and the car accident on the tree. After some time Suchitra woke up and cried a lot has she saw JKR was dead but fortunately Arjun and her pregnant baby was alive. As this incident happened, on the other hand on the same day Gandhimati started firstly to drive a car and she drove fast on the road that time she doesn't know to stop the car. Immediately she hit an old man and he fall down on road and he asked to help. But Gandhimati shocked and she did not help him, so that the old man died. As both accidents are related and coincide with each other, because both JKR and Gandhimati hit the same old man, he is none other than Vasu's grandfather Krishnamoorthy. The story behind is young Vasu, her mother Thulasi and her grandfather was waited for bus to move from the city. That period, Vasu had only mother not father. As her grandfather gave a silver coin to Vasu to keep this coin has safe and secure. After long time the bus not came, so that Vasu's grandfather told them that he will asked somebody for the bus time, so he leaves them and went to ask. As he cross the road that time only JKR hit him by the car, so Vasu's grandfather fall down. But his good time he not got any injury and he woke up from that place and ready to move, but promptly Gandhimati hit him and again he had an accident, was injured heavily and died. As Vasu and her mother learnt this news and worried a lot, that how they will manage their life, Gandhimati's brother decided and married Vasu's mother. So that only Gandhimati hates Vasu and Suchitra worried about Arjun.

Cast

Main
 Asha Gowda as Vasundhara Arjun a.k.a. "Vasu" – Arjun's secretary, she loves Arjun, turned his wife and she is the real heart-friend (2019–2022)  
 Nanda Gopal as Arjun – The JKR company head, Suchitra's son and Vasu's husband (2019–2022)

Others
 Nalini as Gandhimathi (Paati): Vasu and Elakkiya's grandmother (but biologically aunt) (2019–2022)
 Gayathri as Suchitra: JKR's wife, Arjun and Aanand's mother (2019–2022)
 Devi Teju as Indrani: JKR's sister, Suchitra's sister-in-law and Nakshatra's mother (2021–2022)
 Shankaresh Kumar as Aanand: Arjun's younger brother, Suchitra's second son, Elakkiya's love interest, Nakshatra's fiancé but he loved Meenakshi and married her (2019–2022)
 Madhumitha Illayaraja as Nakshatra: Indira's daughter, Arjun cousin, Aanand's cousin and ex-fiancée (2019–2022)
 Fouzil Hidhayah as Elakkiya (Lucky): Vasu's half-sister, Gandhimati's grand daughter and she loved Aanand (2019–2022)
 Vaishali Thaniga as Meenakshi: Ilamaaran's younger sister, Arjun's ex-fiancée, Aanand love interest and turns his wife (2020–2022) 
 Vinitha Jaganathan (2020–2021) / Sandhya Ramachandran (2021–2022) as Iniya: A thief, Arjun's fake heart-friend and became his fiancée
 Vasanth Gopinath as Utthaman: Arjun's personal assistant (2020–2022) 
 Vishnukanth as Ilamaaran: A businessman, Meenakshi's brother and Vasu's ex-fiancé (2020–2022) 
 Barath as Jyothimani: Gandhimathi's friend and crime partner (2019–2022) 
 Baby Joyce as Thulasi: Vasu and Elakkiya's mother (2019–2022)  
 Veena Venkatesh as Pappima: Arjun and Aanand's grandmother (2019–2020) 
 Jeeva Ravi as Jaikrishna "JKR" Rajashekar: Arjun and Aanand's father, he died in a car accident (2019–2020) 
 Vijay Krishnaraj as Krishnamoorthy: Vasu's grandfather, he died in a car accident (2019–2020)

Special appearance
 Laila as herself – She came has a guest for Arjun's marriage (2020)
 Kousalya Senthamarai as Soundharya: Ilamaaran and Meenakshi's grandmother (2020)
 Sharmila Thapa as Jennifer: A beggar and Hindi teacher of Jyothimani (2020) 
 Kushboo Sundar as Dr. Mangalam – Suchitra's friend, All-rounder and a doctor (2021)
 Vaiyapuri as Varudhukutty – Mangalam's Assistant (2021)

Adaptations

Special & Crossover episodes 
 Gokulathil Seethai cast and crew joined Maha Sangamam with the series "Yaaradi Nee Mohini" from 3 August 2020 to 16 August 2020.
 Gokulathil Seethai cast and crew joined Maha Sangamam with the series "Yaaradi Nee Mohini" for the second time from 15 February 2021 to 28 February 2021.
 On 10 October 2021, Gokulathil Seethai holds a wedding episode titled as Gokulathil Seethai Mega Thirumana Vaibhavam for Arjun and Vasundhra's marriage, which aired for non-stop two and half hours on Sunday.
 On 9 January 2022, this series held a two hour special episode on Sunday titled as Gokulathil Seethai MEGA Sunday Kondattam.

References

External links
 
 Gokulathil Seethai on ZEE5

Zee Tamil original programming
Tamil-language romance television series
Tamil-language television shows
2019 Tamil-language television series debuts
2022 Tamil-language television series endings
Television shows set in Tamil Nadu
Tamil-language television series based on Telugu-language television series